Tekella is a genus of South Pacific araneomorph spiders in the family Cyatholipidae, and was first described by A. T. Urquhart in 1894.

Species
 it contains five species, all found in New Zealand:
Tekella absidata Urquhart, 1894 – New Zealand
Tekella bisetosa Forster, 1988 – New Zealand
Tekella lineata Forster, 1988 – New Zealand
Tekella nemoralis (Urquhart, 1889) (type) – New Zealand
Tekella unisetosa Forster, 1988 – New Zealand

References

Araneomorphae genera
Cyatholipidae